= ABC HD =

ABC HD may refer to:

- ABC HD (Australia), a high definition simulcast of television channel ABC in Australia
- ABC HD (United States), a high definition simulcast of television channel ABC in the US
